Daniele Meucci (born 7 October 1985) is an Italian athlete who specialises in long-distance running, including track running, cross country and road running who won twenty medals at international level (seventeen at senior level and three at youth level).

He represented Italy at the 2012 Summer Olympics, running in the 5000 metres and 10,000 metres. Meucci is a three-time medallist in the latter event at the European Athletics Championships, having won bronze in 2010 and 2016 and silver in 2012. He was also a bronze medallist at the European Cross Country Championships in 2012. He has competed at five World Championships in Athletics (2009 and 2011 in the 5000 m, 2011, 2013 and 2017 in the 10000 m and 2015 in the marathon).

Biography

Early career
Born in Pisa, he began competing internationally in 2006 and was fourteen at the European Cup 10000m and improved to tenth place in the 10000 metres at the 2006 European Athletics Championships. He won a bronze medal and a team silver medal at under-23 level at that year's European Cross Country Championships, which was held in San Giorgio su Legnano. The following year he was sixth at the 2007 European Cup 10000m in Ferrara and won the 10,000 m bronze at the 2007 European Athletics U23 Championships.

He represented Italy on the world stage for the first time in 2008, but he only managed 99th place in the senior race at the 2008 IAAF World Cross Country Championships. He had greater success at European level that year, again taking sixth in the European Cup race and finishing twelfth in the senior race at the 2008 European Cross Country Championships.

Meucci took up road running in 2009 and was fifth at the Stramilano Half Marathon with a time of 1:02:56. He returned to the track in the summer and took on the shorter 3000 metres at the 2009 European Team Championships, winning a bronze medal. Two months later he competed on the global track stage for the first time but he did not progress out of the 5000 metres heats at the 2009 World Championships in Athletics. Demonstrating his versatility over different surfaces, he was 18th at the 2009 IAAF World Half Marathon Championships on the streets of Birmingham in October (recording a personal best 1:02:43) and led the Italians to the team bronze with a ninth-place finish at the 2009 European Cross Country Championships.

European medals
The Italian slightly improved his half marathon best with a 1:02:41 run for fifth at the 2010 Roma Ostia Half Marathon, and he ran his first full-length marathon at the Rome City Marathon soon after, where he was eleventh overall. He won his first major medal later that year at the 2010 European Athletics Championships. In the men's 10,000 m he headed to the line after winner Mo Farah, but Chris Thompson just pipped Meucci at the line, leaving the Italian with a bronze medal.

The following year he managed only eleventh in the 3000 m at the 2011 European Athletics Indoor Championships He was beaten to the 2011 national title in the 5000 m by Stefano La Rosa, but set a personal best in the 10,000 m as a guest at the UK Championships, completing the distance in a time of 27:44.50 minutes. He represented Italy in both long-distance track events at the 2011 World Championships in Athletics, coming twelfth over 10,000 m and tenth in the 5000 m. After the championships, a half marathon best (1:02:30 hours) came at the Udine Half Marathon and then he was runner-up behind Edwin Soi at the Giro al Sas 10K race. He began 2012 with a third-place finish at the Great Ireland Run.

In April 2012 he set his new personal best on 10,000 m in Palo Alto, California, with time 27:32.86 and qualified for 2012 Olympic team. A month later he ran in the UAE Healthy Kidney 10K road race in New York and was a surprise winner in 28:28 minutes – a personal best. He ran in both the 5000 m and 10,000 m at the 2012 European Athletics Championships: although he came fifth over the shorter distance, he managed a 10,000 m silver medal behind Kenyan-born Polat Kemboi Arıkan. He also doubled up at the 2012 London Olympics, where he was eliminated in the 5000 m and ranked 24th in the 10,000 m. In August he ran personal bests on the 2012 IAAF Diamond League circuit, running 7:41.74 for the 3000 m at the DN Galan and 8:28.28 minutes for the Two miles at the Birmingham Grand Prix. His season ended with two further European medals at the 2012 European Cross Country Championships, where he was the bronze medallist individually and in the team competition, alongside the race winner Andrea Lalli.

He knocked almost a minute and a half off his best at the 2013 NYC Half Marathon, coming second only to Wilson Kipsang in a time of 61:06 minutes.  At the 2014 European Championships, he finished in 6th in the 10000 m and won the men's marathon. At the 2015 World Championships, he competed in the marathon, finishing in 8th place.

In 2019, he competed in the men's marathon at the 2019 World Athletics Championships held in Doha, Qatar. He did not finish his race.

Personal bests
1500 metres: 3:47.32 (2006)
3000 metres: 7:41.74 (2012)
Two miles: 8:28.28 (2012)
5000 metres: 13:19.00 (2012)
10,000 metres: 27:32.86 (2012)
10 Km: 28:08 (2020) - national record
Half marathon: 1:01:05 (2013)
Marathon: 2:10:45 (2018)

Achievements

National titles
He won 10 national championships at senior level.

Italian Athletics Championships
5000 m: 2007, 2008 (2)
10,000 m: 2006, 2007, 2010 (3)
Half marathon: 2014 (1)
Italian Athletics Indoor Championships
3000 m: 2008, 2009 (2)
Italian Cross Country Championships
Long race: 2011, 2017 (2)

See also
Italian all-time top lists - 5000 metres
Italian all-time top lists - 10000 metres
Italian team at the running events
List of Italian records in athletics

References

External links
 

1985 births
Living people
Sportspeople from Pisa
Italian male cross country runners
Italian male long-distance runners
Italian male marathon runners
Athletics competitors of Gruppo Sportivo Esercito
Olympic athletes of Italy
Athletes (track and field) at the 2012 Summer Olympics
Athletes (track and field) at the 2016 Summer Olympics
European Athletics Championships medalists
World Athletics Championships athletes for Italy
Athletes (track and field) at the 2013 Mediterranean Games
Mediterranean Games competitors for Italy